The 14th Writers Guild of America Awards honored the best film writers and television writers of 1961. Winners were announced in 1962.

Winners & Nominees

Film 
Winners are listed first highlighted in boldface.

Television

Special Awards

References

External links 

 WGA.org

1961
W
Writers Guild of America Awards
Writers Guild of America Awards
Writers Guild of America Awards